Railway Union is a trade union for railway staff in Finland.

Railway Union may also refer to:
 Railway Union Sports Club, a multi-sports club in Dublin, Ireland
 Trade unions in the railway industry generally – see :Category:Railway labor unions